Ruperra Castle or Rhiwperra Castle is a Grade II* Listed building and Scheduled Ancient Monument, situated in Lower Machen in the county borough of Caerphilly,  Wales. Built in 1626, the castle is in a ruinous condition as at 2023. Its grounds are listed on the Cadw/ICOMOS Register of Parks and Gardens of Special Historic Interest in Wales.

History
Built in 1626 by Sir Thomas Morgan, Steward to the Earl of Pembroke, it was one of the first of the 'mock' castles to be built in Wales. King Charles I spent two nights at Ruperra Castle in 1645 shortly after the Battle of Naseby. Resultantly the royal coat of arms was added to the decoration on the South Porch, and the present public footpath from Rudry to the Castle is still known as "King's Drive."

It was bought as his home by wealthy John Morgan "the merchant" for 12,400 pounds. He was unmarried and it was consolidated on his death in 1715 into the Tredegar estates of the Morgan family.

It was destroyed by fire in 1785, and rebuilt, resultantly became home, especially in the 19th century, to the heir of the estate. Godfrey Charles Morgan, 2nd Baron, 1st Viscount Tredegar, who was a captain in the 17th Lancers during the Charge of the Light Brigade at the Battle of Balaklava in the Crimean War, was born at Ruperra. It was during the early Victorian age that he undertook a lot of development, adding three new lodges as well as in 1826 a now listed iron bridge, allowing a carriage way through Coed Craig Ruperra and across the Rhymney River to Lower Machen Church where the family and their servants attended Sunday services.

After the death of army officer turned politician Colonel Frederick Courtenay Morgan in 1909, his son Courtenay Morgan, 1st Viscount Tredegar, embarked on a programme of refurbishment. Minor adjustments were made to the main house, but his major improvement was the building of a new stable block to replace the one destroyed by fire in 1895, a new reservoir and pump house in the deer park, and a new power house fitted with duplicate steam-driven generators, dynamos and boilers. The 1840s brew house, laundry and dairy range were converted to accommodate the estates staff.

Courtenay's son, Evan Morgan, 4th Baron, 2nd Viscount Tredegar, poet and noted eccentric with links to Aldous Huxley, Lord Alfred Douglas, Augustus John, Nancy Cunard and H. G. Wells, then owned Ruperra. He grew up there and, apparently, refused to sell it to William Randolph Hearst, whose lover, the actress Marion Davies, wanted a home in South Wales. Later, after Davis saw photographs of St Donat's Castle, Vale of Glamorgan in Country Life magazine, that property was bought and revitalised by Hearst in 1925 as a gift to Davis.

But by 1935, the Morgan fortune was in decline. Despite having invested heavily in the property, the Morgan seat and main home remained Tredegar House, with Ruperra used as a weekend hunting lodge. The entire  estate was put up for sale, with the contents either moved to Tredegar House or sold in three-day auction. Un-staffed and effectively abandoned, at the start of World War II, like many other large estate houses, it was taken over by the British Army, under whose control in 1941 it was destroyed by another fire. Post-war, the entire estate was sold onwards as farm land, with the castle left as a decaying ruin, the status in which it remains today.

Ashraf Barakat bought the castle in 1998, and tried to revive the sport of polo in Wales. After failing in a planning permission application to construct nine residential flats within the building, following the discovery of roosting Greater and Lesser horseshoe bats on the premises, he applied to demolish it to build housing; planning permission was refused. In September 2010, Barakat put the castle up for sale, at a price of £1.5M for 14 acres (with an optional further 16 acres), which was sold in about July 2014. It remains privately owned and its condition continues to deteriorate. A pressure group, Ruperra Castle Preservation Trust, has been established which is working for the building's restoration. In 2022 Cadw designated the castle gardens and park Grade II on the Cadw/ICOMOS Register of Parks and Gardens of Special Historic Interest in Wales.

See also
 List of castles in Wales
 Castles in Great Britain and Ireland
 Ruperra Motte

References

RCAHMW, (1981), Glamorgan: The Greater Houses HMSO, pp262–8, pls and ills.

Notes

External links
Ruperra Castle Preservation Trust
Books and Films
Ruperra Castle on Youtube
Castlewales.com on Ruperra

Castles in Caerphilly County Borough
Mock castles in Wales
Houses completed in 1626
Country houses in Wales
Castle ruins in Wales
Grade II* listed buildings in Caerphilly County Borough
Scheduled monuments in Caerphilly
Registered historic parks and gardens in Caerphilly County Borough
1626 establishments in Wales
Elizabethan architecture
Jacobean architecture
Caerphilly